Garra micropulvinus is a species of cyprinid fish in the subfamily Labeoninae. It is endemic to the upper Red River drainage in Yunnan, China. It grows to  standard length.

Ecology
At the type locality in Xichou County, Garra micropulvinus prefer stream stretches with a rapid current and stony substrate. The diet is mostly based on algae, but they also feed on other aquatic plants and on larvae of aquatic insects. According to local knowledge, adults conduct an upstream spawning migration in September–December, with spawning taking place in pools of clear water.

References 

Garra
Freshwater fish of China
Endemic fauna of Yunnan
Taxa named by Zhou Wei (zoologist)
Taxa named by Pan Xiao-Fu
Taxa named by Maurice Kottelat
Fish described in 2005